Winchester, VA–WV MSA is a U.S. metropolitan statistical area (MSA) as defined by the United States Office of Management and Budget (OMB) as of June, 2003. This should not be confused with the City of Winchester, Virginia, the most populous community within this MSA. The population of the MSA as the 2015 U.S. Census Bureau estimates is 133,836.

MSA components
Note: Since a state constitutional change in 1871, all cities in Virginia are independent cities and they are not legally  located in any county. The OMB considers these independent cities to be county-equivalents for the purpose of defining MSAs in Virginia. Each MSA is listed by its counties, then cities, each in alphabetical order, and not by size.

Winchester, VA–WV MSA includes areas in Virginia and the State of West Virginia.

Counties
Hampshire County, West Virginia
Frederick County, Virginia
Independent cities
City of Winchester, Virginia

Communities

Places with more than 10,000 inhabitants
Winchester (Principal city)

Places with 1,000 to 10,000 inhabitants
Shawnee Land, Virginia (census-designated place)
Romney, West Virginia
Stephens City, Virginia
Middletown, Virginia

Places with fewer than 1,000 inhabitants
Springfield, West Virginia (census-designated place)
Capon Bridge, West Virginia
Green Spring, West Virginia (census-designated place)
Lake Holiday, Virginia (census-designated place)

Unincorporated places

See also
List of U.S. Metropolitan Statistical Areas (MSA) in Virginia

References

 
Hampshire County, West Virginia
Frederick County, Virginia
Winchester, Virginia
Metropolitan areas of Virginia
Metropolitan areas of West Virginia